The British Academy Television Craft Awards of 2004 are presented by the British Academy of Film and Television Arts (BAFTA) and were held on 16 May 2004 at The Dorchester, Mayfair, the ceremony was hosted by Alistair McGowan.

Winners and nominees
Winners will be listed first and highlighted in boldface.

Special awards
 Adrian Wood

See also
 2004 British Academy Television Awards

References

External links
British Academy Craft Awards official website

2004 television awards
2004 in British television
2004 in London
May 2004 events in the United Kingdom
2004